Events from the year 1601 in Germany.

Births
 Simon Peter Tilemann
 Johann Michael Moscherosch
 Andreas Reyher
 Dorothea of Saxe-Altenburg
 Justus Gesenius
 Mathias Czwiczek

Deaths
 Peter Thyraeus
 Nikolaus Krell
 Leonhardt Schröter
 Gebhard Truchsess von Waldburg

1600s in the Holy Roman Empire

References